Edy Junior Edouard (born December 16, 1997), known professionally as SNOT (stylized as $NOT), is an American rapper, singer, and songwriter. Born in New York City, he moved to Lake Worth Beach, Florida at seven years old, where he would begin his rap career through SoundCloud in 2016. Snot rose to fame with the release of his breakout single "Gosha" in September 2018. He is currently signed to 300 Entertainment.

Early life and career 
Edouard was born to Haitian and Dominican parents in Brooklyn, New York City, and moved to Lake Worth Beach, Florida at age 7. In early 2016, he started his music career on SoundCloud. In September 2018, he would release a single, "Gosha", which would blast him into the rap scene and kickstart his widespread media popularity.

Career

2017: Career beginnings 
Snot began his music career in 2016 while in high school, revealing to Jack Angell of Complex that he "was listening to dudes like Xavier Wulf, Bones, Yung Lean, Lil Wayne, and Tyler, the Creator... along with Memphis artists like Shawty Pimp and the influential Memphis-based group Three 6 Mafia". Snot expanded more on the topic by stating to interviewers, "That's how I got into this stuff, and things started happening. My friend Wetback Manny was already putting shit on SoundCloud and he introduced me to recording and how to use a microphone. That's when I did it by myself, but I had a USB mic and it was kind of trash. But then Manny got a condenser mic, so I guess I got lucky."

2018–2019: The Tissue Files and "Gosha" 
On April 24, 2018, Snot self-released his first EP The Tissue Files, featuring verses from Cameronazi and Subjectz, as well as production from Frakcija, Kaji, Windxws, and YZ. This EP was Snot's final release before releasing his YZ-produced breakout hit "Gosha" on September 7, 2018.

Snot's single "Billy Boy" was featured in the pilot episode of HBO's American teen drama Euphoria.

2020–present: - Tragedy +, Beautiful Havoc, and Ethereal 
Following the success of his singles "Gosha" and "Megan", Snot signed to 300 Entertainment. On March 6, 2020, Snot released - Tragedy +, his debut studio album, which features Maggie Lindemann and Wifisfuneral and includes the aforementioned singles.

On September 24, 2020, Snot released "Revenge", the first single from his second album, alongside a music video directed by Cole Bennett under his multimedia company Lyrical Lemonade. Snot teamed up with Flo Milli for the project's second single, "Mean", on October 15, 2020, accompanied by another Cole Bennett music video. On October 30, 2020, Snot released his second studio album titled Beautiful Havoc, with 300 Entertainment. The project features Iann Dior, Denzel Curry, and Flo Milli, and charted at number 172 on the Billboard 200. Snot released five additional music videos following the album: "Who Do I Trust" on November 5, 2020, "Watch Out" on December 13, 2020, "Like Me" on January 15, 2021, "Sangria" (featuring Denzel Curry) on February 17, 2021, and "Life" on March 30, 2021.

On April 9, 2021, Snot released the single "Whipski", which features a guest appearance from fellow rapper and singer Lil Skies. It is expected to be the lead single to his third album. "Whipski" became Snot's first song to reach a major chart, peaking at number 25 on the Bubbling Under Hot 100. On May 28, 2021, Snot collaborated with fellow rapper Cochise on the song "Tell Em". This would become his and Cochise's debut on the Billboard Hot 100, peaking at number 64.

On November 24, 2021, Snot  released the single "Go". He followed up with his single "Doja" with ASAP Rocky, released on February 4, 2022. Both singles appear on his third album Ethereal, which Snot released on February 11, 2022. The album features ASAP Rocky, Teddi Jones, Trippie Redd, Kevin Abstract, Juicy J, and Joey Badass. Snot had finished 2022 with his single "SIMPLE" and was released simultaneously with a music video on October 14, 2022.

Discography

Studio albums

Extended plays

Singles

Notes

References 

1997 births
Living people
21st-century African-American male singers
21st-century American rappers
African-American male rappers
American hip hop singers
Chill-out musicians
Chillwave musicians
Emo rap musicians
Lo-fi musicians
People from Lake Worth Beach, Florida
Rappers from New York City
Rappers from Florida
Singers from New York City
Singer-songwriters from New York (state)
Singer-songwriters from Florida
Trap musicians